The 2019 Ukrainian Cup Final is a football match that was played on May 15, 2019 in Zaporizhia between Shakhtar Donetsk and Inhulets Petrove. The match is the 28th Ukrainian Cup Final since fall of the Soviet Union. This is the first time the cup final would be held in Zaporizhia.

If Inhulets win the cup, they will qualify to the group stage of 2019–20 UEFA Europa League, because Shakhtar have already qualified for 2019–20 UEFA Champions League.

For Slavutych Arena this is the second time of hosting games of such level after hosting the 2010 Ukrainian Super Cup. This will be the first final of the Ukrainian Cup competitions that features a team from a second tier division.

Road to the final 

Note: In all results below, the score of the finalist is given first (H: home; A: away).

Previous encounters 
The game between Shakhtar and Inhulets is going to become first between the two teams.

This will be the 19th time for Miners and the competition's record in general for any team reaching the final stage. This will be the 1st time for Inhulets reaching the final stage. It will be the ninth consecutive final for Miners since 2011.

Match

See also
 2018–19 Ukrainian Premier League

References

Cup Final
Ukrainian Cup finals
Ukrainian Cup Final 2019
Ukrainian Cup Final 2019
Ukrainian Cup Final 2019
Ukrainian Cup Final